On July 26, 2013, Larry Jackson Jr. was shot dead by Austin Police Department Detective Charles Kleinert in Austin, Texas. Jackson was at the scene of a bank robbery earlier that day in central Austin. When questioned by Kleinert as to why he falsely identified himself to a bank employee, Jackson ran. When Kleinert caught up to Jackson a struggle between Jackson and Detective Charles Kleinert ensued. One gunshot was fired, fatally striking Jackson in the back of the neck.

Kleinert was indicted by a grand jury on the charge of manslaughter. In October 2015, a judge dropped the charge against Kleinert.

Details
As Kleinert was questioning Jackson concerning why he identified himself to bank employees as a different bank customer and requested access to the account, Jackson ran. Kleinert chased Jackson, enlisted the aid of a passing motorist, and followed on foot under a bridge where a struggle took place. Kleinert's weapon unintentionally discharged striking Jackson in the back of the neck. Kleinert reported that the shooting was accidental. Jackson did not have a weapon on him but had not been searched before running.

Aftermath
After the incident, Kleinert retired from the police force. He was indicted for manslaughter in May 2014. The Austin City Council approved a $1.25 million settlement to Jackson's children in August 2014. Austin Attorney Bobby Taylor represented the children of Larry Jackson. In October 2015, after being removed to federal court a federal judge ruled that Kleinert, a member of an FBI task force, was acting in his capacity as a federal officer. The judge dismissed the case with prejudice asserting the Supremacy Clause applied.

References

2013 in Texas
Black Lives Matter
Deaths by firearm in Texas
History of Austin, Texas
Law enforcement in Texas
July 2013 events in the United States